Waneta Storms (born November 25, 1968) is a Canadian dramatic actress. She is best known for her portrayal of Isobel Lambert in the CTV series The Eleventh Hour (2003–2005).

Storms has also appeared in the Showcase series Naked Josh, Peter Benchley's Amazon, and Nikita amongst other series.   She was nominated for a Gemini Award in each of her three seasons on The Eleventh Hour, as well as for her guest role on Blue Murder in 2001.

Filmography

Movies

Television

Writer

External links

1968 births
Living people
Canadian television actresses
Actresses from Vancouver
Canadian stage actresses
Canadian Film Centre alumni